Ourense is a comarca in the Galician Province of Ourense. The overall population of this  local region is 143,851 (2019).

Municipalities
Amoeiro, Barbadás, Coles, Esgos, Nogueira de Ramuín, Ourense, O Pereiro de Aguiar, A Peroxa, San Cibrao das Viñas, Taboadela, Toén and Vilamarín.

References 

Comarcas of the Province of Ourense